The Czech Republic men's national basketball team represents the Czech Republic in international basketball. The team is controlled by the Czech Basketball Federation (ČBF).

The Czech Republic is the successor to the Czechoslovakia national team after the Czech Republic split from Czechoslovakia, due to the dissolution of the unified state in 1993. The Czech Republic national team made their debut in international competition in a qualifier for the EuroBasket in 1993. The team has qualified for the tournament six times overall. The Czech Republic has also qualified for the FIBA World Cup, where the team reached the quarter-finals in their first appearance in 2019.

History

1990s
In 1993, the Czech Republic national team was officially founded after the dissolution of Czechoslovakia. The team played their first international match on 30 May 1993 against Slovenia.

After several failed attempts at qualifying in 1993, 1995, and 1997 the Czech Republic finally clinched qualification to the EuroBasket finals tournament for the first time after independence at EuroBasket 1999. The national team got off to a quick start, as they won their first two preliminary round matches against Lithuania and Greece, before losing to Germany in their final game of group play. With a record of (2–1), the Czech Republic booked their place into the second group phase. There, the team was thoroughly dominated against Croatia and Italy, before losing a close battle against Turkey 73–78 to exit the tournament. In all, the Czech Republic finished their maiden voyage to the EuroBasket in 12th place. While national team standout Luboš Bartoň took the honor of being the second best scorer of the tournament averaging (18.7 points per game).

2000s
Throughout the 2000s for the Czech Republic, the national team suffered numerous setbacks. Failed attempts to qualify for the EuroBasket on multiple occasions were demoralizing reminders that the team had to become stronger in order to compete with the best on the continental stage. However, during qualification for EuroBasket 2007, led by national team veterans Jiří Welsch, Luboš Bartoň and Petr Benda, the Czech Republic would qualify for their second overall appearance at the competition. In their first game at the 2007 tournament, the national team would lose in a classic against the Dirk Nowitzki led Germany squad in overtime 78–83. The tough loss for the team carried over into their next match, where they would suffer a heavy defeat at the hands of Lithuania 95–75. With one game left in group play, and still an opportunity to advance the Czechs would come up short again, this time to Turkey 72–80 to be eliminated.

2010s
After missing out on the EuroBasket in 2011, the Czech Republic turned the page to qualify for EuroBasket 2013. Their first game of the tournament was against hosts Slovenia. However, the team would succumb in a narrowly contested game between the two sides 60–62. Although the Czechs would show resilience in their second match against Poland, behind a dominant game from big man Jan Veselý and his (23 points and 14 rebounds) to win 68–69. After the strong win for the Czech Republic, their third game of the tournament was a total calamity for the team, as they were completely mauled by the eventual champions Spain 60–39. The humbling loss for the team however, fueled them to a win in their next game against Georgia 95–79. Heading into their final match of group play, with the possibility of advancing all but gone the Czechs would fall to Croatia 70–53.

The Czech Republic entered the EuroBasket 2015, after going (4–2) during qualifying to make their fourth EuroBasket appearance. To begin their 2015 tournament run, the Czech Republic was placed into Group D. The team would easily win their first two matches of the event, before their date versus co-hosts Latvia. However, strong games from team captain Tomáš Satoranský (22 points and 9 assists), and center Jan Veselý (17 points and 11 rebounds) wouldn't be enough as Latvia would prevail 65–72. After the loss, the Czechs would regroup to split their final two games of the group phase to advance to the Round of 16. There, the team displayed supreme focus to defeat Croatia 59–80, to send the team into the quarter-finals of the EuroBasket for the first time. With a chance to reach the semi-finals on the line, the Czechs would fall short against Serbia 89–75. After the tough loss, the team would play two more games in the Olympic bracket qualifier to finish the tournament.

In qualification for the 2016 Olympic tournament, the Czech Republic failed to qualify after going (1–2) and being eliminated, losing to Serbia once again.

At EuroBasket 2017, the Czech Republic was drawn into Group C for their stint at the tournament. Although the team was quickly eliminated, failing to make it out of the group stage after posting a disappointing (1–4) record.

During European Qualifiers for the 2019 FIBA World Cup, the Czech Republic amassed an (8–4) record during qualifying to solidify their first ever trip to the World Cup finals. Heading toward the 2019 FIBA World Cup, the Czech Republic was slotted into Group E to begin the tournament. The first game for the team, however, would turn out to be a loss against the heavily favoured United States 67–88. Going into their second match of the tournament, the Czechs picked up their first ever World Cup finals victory over Japan. With one game to go, and a path to advance into the second group phase, the team would pullout a solid 76–91 win over Turkey.

Entering the second group phase, the Czech Republic continued their impressive play as the team picked up a huge victory, this time against Brazil 71–93. Although in their final match of group play, the Czechs suffered an 77–84 defeat to Greece. Even after the tough loss, the team would get the help it needed to advance into the quarter-finals, due to the United States eliminating Brazil.

In the quarter-finals, unfortunately, the tournament run for the Czechs would come to an end. The team would be eliminated 82–70 by Australia. With classification matches to determine the final positions, the team would split their two games to be awarded sixth place.

Competitive record

FIBA World Cup

Olympic Games

EuroBasket

Results and fixtures

2021

2022

2023

Team

Current roster
Roster for the 2023 FIBA World Cup Qualifiers matches on 23 and 26 February 2023 against France and Montenegro.

Depth chart

Head coach history
 Zdeněk Hummel – (1993–2000)
 Michal Ježdík – (2001–2006)
 Zdeněk Hummel – (2006–2007)
 Michal Ježdík – (2008–2009)
 Pavel Budinský – (2010–2013)
 Ronen Ginzburg – (2013–present)

Past rosters
1999 EuroBasket: finished 12th among 16 teams

4 Petr Czudek, 5 Petr Welsch, 6 Vladan Vahala, 7 Marek Stuchlý, 8 Jiří Welsch, 9 David Klapetek, 10 Jiří Okáč, 11 Luboš Bartoň,12 Petr Treml, 13 Martin Ides, 14 Kamil Novák, 15 Pavel Bečka (Coach: Zdeněk Hummel)

2007 EuroBasket: finished 15th among 16 teams

4 Štěpán Vrubl, 5 Pavel Beneš, 6 Maurice Whitfield, 7 Michal Křemen, 8 Lukáš Kraus, 9 Jiří Welsch, 10 Ladislav Sokolovský,11 Luboš Bartoň, 12 Radek Nečas, 13 Petr Benda, 14 Jakub Houška, 15 Ondřej Starosta (Coach: Zdeněk Hummel)

2013 EuroBasket: finished 14th among 24 teams

4 Petr Benda, 5 Ondřej Balvín 6 Pavel Pumprla, 7 Vojtěch Hruban, 8 Tomáš Satoranský, 9 Jiří Welsch, 10 Pavel Houška,11 Luboš Bartoň, 12 David Jelínek, 13 Jakub Kudláček, 14 Kamil Švrdlík, 15 Jan Veselý (Coach: Pavel Budínský)

2015 EuroBasket: finished 7th among 24 teams

4 Petr Benda, 5 Patrik Auda, 6 Pavel Pumprla, 7 Vojtěch Hruban, 8 Tomáš Satoranský (C), 9 Jiří Welsch, 10 Pavel Houška,11 Luboš Bartoň, 12 David Jelínek, 13 Jakub Šiřina, 14 Blake Schilb, 24 Jan Veselý (Coach: Ronen Ginzburg)

2017 EuroBasket: finished 20th among 24 teams

1 Patrik Auda, 7 Vojtěch Hruban, 8 Tomáš Satoranský (C), 9 Jiří Welsch, 11 Lukáš Palyza, 13 Jakub Šiřina, 14 Kamil Švrdlík,15 Martin Peterka, 17 Jaromir Bohačík, 23 Adam Pecháček, 31 Martin Kříž, 71 Tomáš Kyzlink (Coach: Ronen Ginzburg)

2019 FIBA World Cup: finished 6th among 32 teams

1 Patrik Auda, 4 Tomáš Vyoral, 6 Pavel Pumprla, 7 Vojtěch Hruban, 8 Tomáš Satoranský (C), 11 Blake Schilb, 12 Ondřej Balvín,13 Jakub Šiřina, 15 Martin Peterka, 17 Jaromír Bohačík, 23 Lukáš Palyza, 31 Martin Kříž (Coach: Ronen Ginzburg)

2020 Olympic Games: finished 9th among 12 teams

1 Patrik Auda, 4 Tomáš Vyoral, 8 Tomáš Satoranský (C), 11 Blake Schilb, 12 Ondřej Balvín, 13 Jakub Šiřina, 15 Martin Peterka,17 Jaromír Bohačík, 19 Ondřej Sehnal, 23 Lukáš Palyza, 24 Jan Veselý, 25 David Jelínek (Coach: Ronen Ginzburg)

2022 EuroBasket: finished 16th among 24 teams

1 Patrik Auda, 7 Vojtěch Hruban (C), 8 Tomáš Satoranský, 12 Ondřej Balvín, 15 Martin Peterka, 17 Jaromír Bohačík, 19 Ondřej Sehnal,24 Jan Veselý, 25 David Jelínek, 27 Vít Krejčí, 31 Martin Kříž, 77 Tomáš Kyzlink (Coach: Ronen Ginzburg)

See also

Sport in the Czech Republic
Czech Republic women's national basketball team
Czech Republic men's national under-20 basketball team
Czech Republic men's national under-19 basketball team
Czech Republic men's national under-17 basketball team
Czechoslovakia men's national basketball team
Basketball in the Czech Republic

References

External links

 
Czech Republic FIBA profile 
Czech Republic National Team – Men at Eurobasket.com

Men's national basketball teams
Basketball in the Czech Republic
1993 establishments in the Czech Republic
Basketball